Ash Brook is a watercourse in Greater Manchester and a tributary of the River Roch.

Tributaries
Wardle Brook

Rivers of the Metropolitan Borough of Rochdale
1